Ryan Shay (May 4, 1979 – November 3, 2007) was an American professional long-distance runner who won several USA championships titles. He was born in Ypsilanti, Michigan, and attended the University of Notre Dame. He was married to Alicia Craig, also an American distance runner.

Running career

High school
Ryan Shay attended Central Lake High School in Central Lake, Michigan, home of the Trojans, from 1993 to 1997. He won every cross country meet he competed following the third meet of his freshman year (1993), including four consecutive Class-D MHSAA Lower Peninsula (LP) state cross country meets from 1993 to 1996.  He was a three-time consecutive Class D MHSAA LP state champion in the 1600-meter and 3200-meter runs from his sophomore through senior track seasons (1995 through 1997), and also won the Class-D MHSAA LP state title in the 800-meter run as a sophomore. He was also his class valedictorian.

Collegiate
Shay continued running as a student-athlete at the University of Notre Dame in the fall of 1997, majoring in economics and competing in both cross country and track. He was a 9-time All-American while competing at Notre Dame. Shay was the first Notre Dame runner to win an NCAA individual title, winning the 10,000-meter run at the 2001 NCAA outdoor meet in a time of 29:05.44.  Shay graduated as the school record holder in both the indoor and outdoor 5,000-meter runs, as well as the 10,000-meter run. He graduated in the top of his class.

Post-collegiate/professional
Following college, Shay ran professionally, winning races at various distances, including marathon, half-marathon, 20 km and 15 km. Shay also competed during the 2005 IAAF World Half Marathon Championships, finishing 15th in the men's individual race. Shay finished in 23rd place in the 2004 Men's Olympic Marathon Trials.

USA Running Circuit
Shay was a five-time road national champion in the 15 km, 20 km, marathon and twice in the half marathon. In 2003 after winning both the USA Half Marathon Championships and the USA Marathon Championships as well as placing third in the USA 25 km Championships and the USA 5 km Championships Shay was named the 2003 USA Running Circuit Champion. Shay repeated as the USA Running Circuit Champion in 2004 after winning both the USA Half Marathon Championships and the USA 20 km Championships as well as finishing second in the USA 25 km Championships and USA 5 km Championships and placing third at the USA 10 Mile Championships. In 2005 Shay came in second place in the USA Running Circuit Championships standings, third in 2006 and 10th in 2007.

Death

On November 3, 2007, during the US Olympic marathon trials in New York City, Shay collapsed approximately  into the race at 8:06 a.m. He was taken to Lenox Hill Hospital, where he was pronounced dead at 8:46 a.m. Doctors at the hospital who examined him reported that he died of heart failure due to cardiac arrhythmia, due to a pre–existing enlarged heart condition.  Autopsy results were initially inconclusive, leading to speculation over other possibilities for his death.
On March 18, 2008, Ellen Borakove, the Director of Public Affairs of the New York Chief Medical Examiner's Office released the following statement to Joe Shay, Ryan's father, regarding his final autopsy results:
"Cardiac arrhythmia due to cardiac hypertrophy with patchy fibrosis of undetermined etiology. Natural causes."

Achievements
2005 USATF 15 km Champion
2004 USATF 20 km Champion
2004 USATF Half-Marathon Champion
2003 USATF Half-Marathon Champion
2003 USATF Marathon Champion
2001 NCAA Outdoor Track & Field Champion (10000-meter run)
2001 Big East Conference Outdoor Track & Field Champion (10000-meter run)
2001 Big East Conference Indoor Track & Field Champion (5000-meter run)
2000 Big East Conference Outdoor Track & Field Champion (5000-meter & 10000-meter runs)
1999 Big East Conference Cross Country Champion
1999 Big East Conference Indoor Track & Field Champion (3000-meter run)

Competition record

International competitions

USA National Championships

Road

Track and field

Cross country

NCAA championships

Track and field

Cross country

References

External links

Notre Dame Athletic Website

28-Year-Old Marathoner Dies in Olympic Trials (New York Times)
Small Town Mourns a Running Marvel (New York Times)
Still No Answer on What Caused Runner's Death (New York Times)
After a Death, Time for Life and a Race (New York Times)
USATF comment on the death of Ryan Shay
Associated Press- Star Runner Dies During Marathon Trials
Discussion of possible causes of death for Ryan Shay (Science of Sport)
Pure Heart: Amby Burfoot writes of Shay in the February 2008 issue of Runner's World

1979 births
2007 deaths
Sportspeople from Ypsilanti, Michigan
Track and field athletes from Michigan
American male long-distance runners
Sports deaths in New York (state)
Notre Dame Fighting Irish men's track and field athletes
Notre Dame Fighting Irish men's cross country runners